Basella alba is an edible perennial vine in the family Basellaceae. It is found in tropical Asia and Africa where it is widely used as a leaf vegetable. It is native to the Indian subcontinent, Southeast Asia and New Guinea. It is naturalized in China, tropical Africa, Brazil, Belize, Colombia, Philippines, the West Indies, Fiji and French Polynesia.

Basella alba is known by common names including  Malabar spinach, vine spinach, Ceylon spinach and Indian spinach.

Description

Basella alba is a fast-growing, soft-stemmed vine, reaching  in length.  Its thick, semi-succulent, heart-shaped leaves have a mild flavour and mucilaginous texture. There are two varieties - green and red. The stem of the Basella alba is green with green leaves and the stem of the cultivar Basella alba 'Rubra' is reddish-purple; the leaves form green and as the plant reaches maturity, older leaves will develop a purple pigment starting at the base of the leaf and work towards the end. The stem when crushed usually emits a strong scent. Malabar spinach can be found at many Asian supermarkets, as well as farmers' markets.

Soil and climate requirements
If grown in acceptable conditions, its peak-season growth can accelerate remarkably. Growth is slower in cooler temperatures; its growth will not be vigorous if daytime temperatures fall at or below 10-15°C (approx. 50-60°F), resulting in low yields. Given its natural ancestry of the Indian subcontinent, Malabar spinach is a true tropical plant, and has a natural preference for daytime temperatures between 21°-32°C (approx. 70°-90°F). It will even display remarkable growth around 37°C (approx. 100°F), though care must be taken to avoid sunburn with higher temperatures, by providing shade cloth, screening, or umbrella cover in summer. Flowering is induced during the short-day months of the year. It grows best in well-drained and loamy soils, that are rich in organic matter, with pH ranging from 5.5 to 7.0, but can tolerate slightly lower or higher if adjustments cannot be made.

Nutrition
The edible leaves are 93% water, 3% carbohydrates, 2% protein, and contain negligible fat (table). In a 100 gram reference amount, the leaves supply 19 calories of food energy, and are a rich source (20% or more of the Daily Value) of vitamins A and C, folate, and manganese, with moderate levels of B vitamins and several dietary minerals (table).

Uses

In Sri Lanka, it is used to make different kinds of curries specially with dal. In the Philippines, the leaves of this vegetable are one of the main ingredients in an all vegetable dish called utan served over rice. It is usually cooked with sardines, onions, garlic, and parsley. In Mangalorean Tuluva cuisine, a coconut based gravy called gassi is paired with Basella alba, making a delicacy called Basale gassi to be eaten with rice dumplings called pundi soaked overnight in the gravy, or with red rice. Some variations have tiny prawns, clams, horsegram or dried fish in the gravy.

In Bengali cuisine, it is widely used both in a vegetable dish, cooked with red pumpkin, and in non-vegetarian dishes, cooked with the bones of the Ilish fish and may also be cooked with shrimp. In Odia cuisine, it is cooked with mustard paste to make "poi saaga rai". In Andhra Pradesh, a southern state in India, a curry of Basella alba and yam is made. In Gujarat, fresh big and tender leaves are washed, dipped in besan mix and deep-fried to make crispy pakodas called "poi na bhajia".

The vegetable is used in Chinese cuisine. It has many names including flowing water vegetable. It is often used in stir-frys and soups. In Vietnam, where it is called mồng tơi, it is cooked with shrimp, crab meat, luffa and jute to make soup. In Africa, the mucilaginous cooked shoots are most commonly used.

Historically, the red variety of Basella alba has also been used to make red dye in China.

Gallery

References

External links

PROTAbase on Basella alba
Photo and multilingual synonyms
University of Florida Agricultural Extension
Evaluation of tropical leaf vegetables in the Virgin Islands

Basellaceae
Bengali cuisine
Chinese cuisine
Flora of tropical Asia
Indian cuisine
Thai cuisine
Leaf vegetables
Perennial vegetables
Plants described in 1753
Taxa named by Carl Linnaeus
Vietnamese cuisine